Imaduwa is a suburb of Galle. It is situated on the boundary of Galle district and Matara District. It is a major centre which connects Matara District with Galle district. It is a major suburb on the A17 highway, after Galle. It is a major centre on the road for the vehicles and long distance buses run on the route. And also it is a four-way junction on the road. It connects Makumbura-Yakkalamulla-Imaduwa road and Dikkumbura (Ahangama)-Imaduwa road with the A17 highway which runs between Galle and Madampe.

Although it is mainly a working class and farming area, today it has become an important business centre for the villagers who live in the villages surrounding Imaduwa.

History
It was a village belonged to the ancient Magama kingdom. The nearer Paragoda Raja Maha Vihara which was built by a king, is a significant factor to prove that this region was a significant region from the past, Anuradhapura reign.

Local facilities
Banks – National Savings Bank, Bank of Ceylon, People's Bank, Regional Development Bank
Hospitals – Imaduwa District Hospital
Schools – Bateymulla National School, Paragoda Gunarathana Junior School
Imaduwa Police Post
Kananke Police Station (Nearby)
Imaduwa Post Office

Public Transport

Expressways
The E01 Expressway (Southern Expressway) goes through A17 highway at Imaduwa. There is an interchange of Southern Expressway at Imaduwa. It is the main entrance and exit of the A17 highway, Akuressa ,  Habaraduwa , Ahangama villagers to the Southern Expressway. At present, no bus services operate from Imaduwa via Southern Expressway.

Bus Routes
As Imaduwa is a major suburb on the A17 highway, several bus routes operate from Imaduwa and via Imaduwa through the A17 highway. And also it has several bus routes which can be used to access to Galle city and some other suburbs, i.e. Yakkalamulla, Ahangama, and Dikkumbura. There are bus routes which connects Imaduwa with Matara and some other suburbs in the Matara District, i.e. Weligama and Akuressa.

See also
Galle
Yakkalamulla
List of towns in Southern Province, Sri Lanka

External links

Populated places in Southern Province, Sri Lanka